The canton of Lons-le-Saunier-2 is an administrative division of the Jura department, eastern France. It was created at the French canton reorganisation which came into effect in March 2015. Its seat is in Lons-le-Saunier.

It consists of the following communes:
 
Bornay
Chilly-le-Vignoble
Courbouzon
Frébuans
Geruge
Gevingey
Lons-le-Saunier (partly)
Macornay
Messia-sur-Sorne
Moiron
Trenal
Vernantois

References

Cantons of Jura (department)